Elmo Bolton Hunter (October 23, 1915 – December 27, 2003) was a United States district judge of the United States District Court for the Western District of Missouri.

Education and career

Born in St. Louis, Missouri, Hunter received an Artium Baccalaureus degree from the University of Missouri in 1936 and a Bachelor of Laws from the University of Missouri School of Law in 1938. He was a law clerk to Judge Kimbrough Stone of the United States Court of Appeals for the Eighth Circuit from 1938 to 1939. He was senior assistant city counselor for Kansas City, Missouri from 1939 to 1941, and was a Fellow with the Cook Fellowship at the University of Michigan Law School in 1941. He was a Special Assistant United States Attorney for the Western District of Missouri and District of Kansas for prosecution of war fraud cases from 1941 to 1942. He served in the United States Army as a Lieutenant during World War II, from 1942 to 1945. He then went into private practice in Kansas City, Missouri from 1945 to 1951. Hunter was a Judge of the Circuit Court of Missouri from 1951 to 1957, and then on the Kansas City District of the Missouri Court of Appeals from 1957 to 1965. During this time, he was an Instructor of law at the University of Missouri from 1952 to 1962.

Federal judicial service

On July 14, 1965, Hunter was nominated by President Lyndon B. Johnson to a seat on the United States District Court for the Western District of Missouri vacated by Judge Floyd Robert Gibson. Hunter was confirmed by the United States Senate on August 11, 1965, and received his commission the same day. He served as Chief Judge in 1980. He assumed senior status on December 31, 1980, and served in that capacity until his death on December 27, 2003, in Lee's Summit, Missouri.

References

Sources
 

1915 births
2003 deaths
Lawyers from St. Louis
Military personnel from Missouri
Missouri state court judges
Missouri Court of Appeals judges
Judges of the United States District Court for the Western District of Missouri
United States district court judges appointed by Lyndon B. Johnson
20th-century American judges
United States Army officers
University of Missouri School of Law alumni
Assistant United States Attorneys